Phyllonorycter acutissimae is a moth of the family Gracillariidae. It is known from Japan (the islands of Hokkaidō, Honshū, Kyūshū and Shikoku) and Korea.

The larvae feed on Castanea crenata, Quercus acutissima, Quercus aliena, Quercus crispula, Quercus mongolica, Quercus serrata and Quercus variabilis. They mine the leaves of their host plant. The mine has the form of a ptychonomous leaf mine on the lower surface of the leaves.

References

acutissimae
Moths of Asia

Moths of Japan
Moths of Korea
Taxa named by Tosio Kumata
Moths described in 1963
Leaf miners